The American Music Award for Favorite Duo or Group – Pop/Rock has been awarded since 1974. Years reflect the year in which the awards were presented, for works released in the previous year (until 2003 onward when awards were handed out in November of the same year). The most-awarded artist in this category is 
BTS. The group claimed the all-time record when they won the award for a fourth consecutive year at the 2022 ceremony. No other act has earned as many consecutive wins.

Winners and nominees

1970s

1980s

1990s

2000s

2010s

2020s

Category facts

Multiple wins

 4 wins
 BTS
 3 wins
 Aerosmith
 The Black Eyed Peas
 Hall & Oates
 One Direction

 2 wins
 Backstreet Boys
 Bee Gees
 Chicago
 Eagles
 Fleetwood Mac
 Maroon 5

Multiple nominations

 7 nominations
 Maroon 5

 6 nominations
 Eagles

 5 nominations
 Imagine Dragons
 Nickelback
 U2

 4 nominations
 BTS
 Fleetwood Mac
 One Direction

 3 nominations
 Aerosmith
 Backstreet Boys
 The Black Eyed Peas
 Coldplay
 Hall & Oates
 NSYNC
 OneRepublic
 Van Halen

 2 nominations
 3 Doors Down
 Bee Gees
 Bon Jovi
 The Chainsmokers
 Chicago
 Creed
 Dave Matthews Band
 Def Leppard
 Earth, Wind & Fire
 Genesis
 Gladys Knight & the Pips
 Hootie & the Blowfish
 Huey Lewis and the News
 Jonas Brothers
 Linkin Park
 Matchbox Twenty
 New Kids on the Block
 Tony Orlando and Dawn

References

American Music Awards
Pop music awards
Rock music awards
Awards established in 1974
1974 establishments in the United States